Acacia eriopoda, commonly known as the Broome pindan wattle and the narrow-leaf pindan wattle, is a species of wattle in the legume family that is native to northern Western Australia. It is also known as Yirrakulu to the Nyangumarta people.

Description
It grows as an erect shrub or small tree,  in height. It produces yellow flowers from April to September. It has either a single trunk or divides into four or less erect, straight main stems close to the base. The open to almost dense canopy has a delicate appearance. It has mid-grey to light grey coloured bark that is finely longitudinally fissured alongh the trunks and main branches becoming smooth of smaller branches. The green to grey-green phyllodes sometimes have a yellowish tinge. They are also straight to very shallowly incurved with numerous parallel longitudinal fine nerves. The simple inflorescences form as flower-spikes with a length of around  densley packed with light golden flowers. The pods are thinly coriaceous-crustaceous and straight to shallowly curved with a light brown colour when mature with a variably white-scurfy surface.

Taxonomy
The species was first formally described by the botanists Joseph Maiden and William Blakely in 1927 as part of the work Descriptions of fifty new species and six varieties of western and northern Australian Acacias, and notes on four other species as published in the Journal of the Royal Society of Western Australia. It was reclassified as Racosperma eriopodum by Leslie Pedley in 2003 then transferred back to genus Acacia in 2006.
The specific epithet is derived from the Greek erio- meaning wool and -poda meaning foot in reference to the short hairy pedicels.

Distribution and habitat
It occurs on red sandy soils in the Carnarvon, Central Kimberley, Dampierland, Gascoyne, Great Sandy Desert, Little Sandy Desert, Ord Victoria Plain, Pilbara and Tanami IBRA bioregions. It is associated with pindan habitats. It is mostly found in the Kimberley region with some of the population found in the Pilbara where it is found in along watercourses and on low rocky ranges where it grows on deep red sand and alluvial pindan plain in sandy soils.

See also
List of Acacia species

References

eriopoda
Acacias of Western Australia
Fabales of Australia
Plants described in 1928
Taxa named by Joseph Maiden
Taxa named by William Blakely
Endemic flora of Western Australia